The Copa de la Liga (League Cup in Spanish) was a Spanish football tournament created in 1982.

Due to time constraints, saturation and club pressure, the competition only lasted four years, being cancelled in 1986. Winning the trophy helped two clubs to complete cup doubles: FC Barcelona with the Copa del Rey (1983) and Real Madrid with the UEFA Cup (1985). In all four finals, the team that played the second leg at home won the trophy.

History 
The League Cup was promoted by the president of FC Barcelona, Josep Lluís Núñez, in order to create a new competition that would generate new economic income for the clubs, both in terms of box office and television rights.

In 1986 the fourth and last edition was held. In 1987, the fifth edition was scheduled to be held with a new “final three” format (which would have replaced the Supercopa de España, which for this reason was not held in the 1987 or 1988 seasons), for which they were already classified. Real Madrid (League champion), Real Sociedad (Cup champion) and Atlético Madrid (champion of the “intermediate league” of the “Playoff League”). The clubs finally agreed to cancel the competition due to the saturation of the match schedule, especially due to the strange League format of that 1986–87 season.

Format
The League Cup was a straight knock-out competition. All ties were played over two legs, home and away, with the team with the largest aggregate score progressing. The final also consisted of two games.

If the aggregate score was tied after two legs of ninety minutes each, extra-time would be played. If that failed to separate the teams, a penalty shootout would determine the winner. Unlike the Copa del Rey, the away goals rule was not applied.

Champions

Top goalscorers

Source:

Notes

References

External links
Spain – List of League Cup Finals; at RSSSF

 
National association football league cups
Defunct football cup competitions in Spain
1982–83 in Spanish football cups
1983–84 in Spanish football cups
1984–85 in Spanish football cups
1985–86 in Spanish football cups
Recurring sporting events established in 1983
Recurring sporting events disestablished in 1986
1983 establishments in Spain
1986 disestablishments in Spain
History of football in Spain